Crous may refer to:
 Marie Crous (dates of birth and death unknown), a French mathematician
 Pedro Willem Crous (born 1963 in Crous), a botanist
 Piet Crous (born 1955), a South African professional boxer

See also 
 CROUS (Centre régional des œuvres universitaires et scolaires)